Socha Na Tha is 2016 a Pakistani drama serial directed by Ali Hassan and written by Sarwar Nazeer. The drama featured Noor Hassan Rizvi, Iqra Aziz, Jinaan Hussain and Asad Siddiqui in lead roles, and was first aired 25 March 2016 on ARY Zindagi.

Cast
Noor Hassan Rizvi as Zaka
Iqra Aziz as Shafaq
Asad Siddiqui as Murtaza
Jinaan Hussain as Sawera
Khaled Anam as Shafaq's father
Saima Qureshi as Kubra
Ismat Zaidi as Zaka's grandmother
Amir Qureshi as Zaka's father
Salma Hassan as Zarina
Huma Nawab as Amna
Ismat Iqbal as Murtaza's mother
Sarah Razi
Urooj Naz
Mariyam Tiwana
Usman Patel

References

External links 
 

Pakistani drama television series
2016 Pakistani television series debuts
2017 Pakistani television series endings
Urdu-language television shows
ARY Zindagi original programming